67 may refer to: 
 67 (number)
 one of the years 67 BC, AD 67, 1967, 2067
 67, a 1992 song by Love Battery from the album Between the Eyes
 67 (rap group), a drill music group from London

See also
 67th Regiment (disambiguation)
 67th Division (disambiguation)
 67 Squadron (disambiguation)
 67th Academy Awards